Seven Wonders of the World is a 1956 documentary film in Cinerama. Lowell Thomas searches the world for natural and man-made wonders and invites the audience to try to update the ancient Greek list of the "Wonders of the World".

Cast
Lowell Thomas as himself
Paul Mantz as himself 
Claude Dauphin as Narrator (French version) / Récitant (voice)

Production
Merian C. Cooper started Seven Wonders of the World as the second Cinerama film after 1952's This Is Cinerama. By September 1953, $1 million had already been spent and it was estimated that it would cost a further $1 million to complete.

Stanley Warner Corp. acquired the rights to the film (and all Cinerama product) during production.

Cinerama Holiday, which started production later, was released before Seven Wonders of the World, which then became the third Cinerama film to be released.

Reception
The film grossed $32.1 million in the United States and Canada. It spent more than 14 months on release at the Casino Theatre in Buenos Aires, a record run in Argentina.

See also
List of American films of 1956

References

External links
 
 
Travel log of Seven Wonders of the World

1956 films
1956 documentary films
American documentary films
Cinerama
1950s English-language films
Films directed by Andrew Marton
Films directed by Tay Garnett
Films directed by Ted Tetzlaff
Films scored by David Raksin
Films scored by Emil Newman
Films scored by Jerome Moross
Films scored by Sol Kaplan
Documentary films about India
Films shot in India
Films shot in Agra
Films shot in Darjeeling
Films shot in Delhi
Films shot in Varanasi
1950s American films